Ostracod Limestone may refer to:
 Kilmaluag Formation or Ostracod Limestone, a Middle Jurassic geologic formation in Scotland
 Ostracod Beds or Ostracod Limestone, a subunit of the Mannville Group, a stratigraphical unit of Cretaceous age in the Western Canadian Sedimentary Basin

See also
 Fossiliferous limestone
 Ostracod